0th or zeroth may refer to:

Mathematics, science and technology
 0th or zeroth, an ordinal for the number 0
 0th dimension, a topological space
 0th element, of a data structure in computer science
 0th law of Thermodynamics
 Zeroth (software), deep learning software for mobile devices

Other uses
 0th grade, another name for kindergarten
 0 Avenue, a road in British Columbia straddling the Canada-US border

See also
 OTH (disambiguation) (with a letter O)
 Zeroth law (disambiguation)
 Zeroth-order (disambiguation)